The Informatics Society of Iran (فارسی: انجمن انفورماتیک ایران) is a non-governmental organization (NGO) established in 1979. ISI is organized for scientific purpose to promote and increased knowledge of computing and its applications in Iran.

History
The programmer Behrooz Parhami was part of the founding team, and the president of ISI from 1979 to 1983. The computer systems and banking automation company Pooya also took part in the creation of ISI.

Committees
The organisation has the following committees:
 Membership
 Public Relations
 Scientific Seminars
 Publications
 Education and Research.

Services 
 Gozaresh Computer Magazine
 Monthly public seminar
 Monthly expert group seminar
 Persian dictionary of computing words

See also
Science and technology in Iran

References

External links
official website

Organizations established in 1979
Non-profit organisations based in Iran
Information technology organisations based in Iran